Boyd is an ancient Scottish surname.

The name is attached to Simon, one of several brothers and children of Alan, son of Flathald. Simon's son Robert was called Boyt or Boyd from the Celtic term boidhe, meaning fair or yellow. Robert the Bruce granted lands to Sir Robert Boyd as the ancestor of the earls of Kilmarnock. The Scottish peerage of the earls of Kilmarnock ends shortly after William Boyd rebelled in the Battle of Culloden in 1746. William was arrested and executed at the Tower of London in 1746. He left a widow and three sons including James, Lord Boyd who married and succeeded his father as the Earl of Errol, taking his mother's title.  

Another theory is of territorial origins which may have been taken from the Bhoid, the Gaelic term for the island of Bute, in the Firth of Clyde. The surname was common in Edinburgh in the 17th century. The Scottish Gaelic form of the surname is Boid (masculine), and Bhoid (feminine).

A
Adam Boyd (born 1982), English footballer
Adele Boyd (1932–2018), American field hockey player
Alice Boyd, Scottish artist
Alan Lennox-Boyd, 1st Viscount Boyd of Merton, British politician
Alan Stephenson Boyd, American politician
Alex Boyd (photographer), Scottish photographer
Alexander Boyd, 3rd Lord Boyd (died after 1508), Scottish noble
Alfred Boyd, Canadian politician
Allen Boyd, American politician
Andrew Kennedy Hutchison Boyd (1825–1899), Scottish writer
Anne Boyd, Australian composer
Archibald Boyd, English cleric
Archibald Boyd-Carpenter, British politician
Archie Boyd (footballer), Scottish footballer
Arnold Boyd, British ornithologist
Arthur Boyd (Arthur Merric Bloomfield Boyd), Australian painter
Arthur Merric Boyd, Australian painter
Augusto Samuel Boyd, President of Panama

B
Belle Boyd, Confederate spy
Benjamin Boyd, Australian pioneer
Bill Boyd (disambiguation)
Billy Boyd (actor), Scottish actor
Blanche McCrary Boyd, American novelist
Bob Boyd (disambiguation), several people
Brandon Boyd, American musician, singer with Incubus
Brittany Boyd, American basketball player
Brian Boyd, New Zealand English professor
Brett Boyd, Australian rugby player

C
Carla Boyd, Australian basketball player
Cayden Boyd, American actor
Cecil Boyd, Irish international rugby player
Chris Boyd (rugby union) (born 1958), New Zealand rugby coach
Christopher Boyd (IT security), computer security expert
Christopher Boyd (politician) (1916–2004), British politician
Colin Boyd, Baron Boyd of Duncansby, Scottish lawyer
Curtis Boyd, American jazz drummer

D
Danah Boyd, American blogger
Daniel Patrick Boyd, American arrested in connection with alleged terrorism
Darius Boyd, Australian rugby league player
Darren Boyd, British actor
David Boyd (disambiguation)
Delisha Boyd, American politician from Louisiana
Devin Boyd, American basketball player
Douglas Boyd, British oboist and conductor
Dustin Boyd, Canadian ice hockey player
Dutch Boyd, American poker player

E
Edwin Alonzo Boyd, Canadian bank robber
Edith B. Boyd, one of the Del Rubio triplets
Elena Boyd, one of the Del Rubio triplets
Eliza Stewart Boyd, first woman on a jury in America
Eric DeWayne Boyd, American felon
Eric L. Boyd, American software engineer
Esna Boyd, Australian tennis player
Eva Boyd, American singer Little Eva

F
Federico Boyd, President of Panama
Francine "Fran" Boyd, a drug addict featured in The Corner; the sister of Bunchie, Sharry, and Stevie Boyd

G
George Boyd (disambiguation), several people
Gordon Boyd (real name: Gordon Needham), British-Australian entertainer
Greg Boyd (disambiguation), several people
Guy Boyd (sculptor), Australian sculptor

H
Harriet Boyd-Hawes, American archaeologist

J
James Boyd (disambiguation), several people
James Boyd, 2nd Lord Boyd (c. 1469–1484), Scottish noble
James Boyd, 9th Lord Boyd (died 1654), Scottish noble
Jason Boyd, American record producer and songwriter known professionally as Poo Bear
Jane Boyd, British artist
Jenna Boyd, American actress
Jenny Boyd, British model, sister of Pattie Boyd
Jerry Boyd (1930–2002), American boxing trainer writing as F.X. Toole
Jim Boyd (disambiguation), several people
Joe Boyd, American record producer
John Boyd (disambiguation), several people
John Boyd Orr, 1st Baron Boyd-Orr, Scottish nutritionist and Nobel Peace Prize winner
John Boyd-Carpenter, Baron Boyd-Carpenter, British politician
Johnny Boyd, American racing driver
Jonathan Boyd (1944–1999), Australian wrestler
Joseph Boyd (disambiguation), several people
Julian Boyd, American basketball player
Justin Boyd (born 19889), Canadian water polo player
Jason Boyd, British actor in Harry Potter and the Order of the Phoenix
James Boyd, later James Hay, 15th Earl of Erroll (1726–1778), Scottish noble

K
Kris Boyd (born 1983), Scottish footballer
Kris Boyd (American football) (born 1996), American football player

L
L. M. Boyd (1927–2007), American columnist
LaVell Boyd (born 1976), American football player
Les Boyd (born 1956), Australian rugby league player
Linn Boyd (1800–1859), American politician
Liona Boyd (born 1949), Canadian musician
Louise Arner Boyd (1887–1972), American explorer
Lucious Boyd (born 1959), American murderer

M
Mackenzie Boyd, fictional character from the British soap opera Emmerdale
Malcolm Boyd (1923–2015), American Episcopal priest and author
Margaret Boyd (1913–1993), English lacrosse player and schoolteacher
Margot Boyd (1913–2008), British actor
Mark Alexander Boyd (1563–1601), Scottish poet
Mark Frederick Boyd (1889–1968), American malariologist and writer 
Marion Boyd (1946–2022), Canadian politician
Martin Boyd (1893–1972), Australian architect and writer
Mary D. R. Boyd (1809–?), American children's author
Matthew Boyd (baseball), (born 1991), American baseball player
Merle Kodo Boyd (1943–2022), American Zen Buddhist nun
Merric Boyd (1888–1959) Australian artist
Michele Boyd, American actress
Mike Boyd (disambiguation)
Milly Boyd, one of the Del Rubio triplets

N
Nancy Boyd, pseudonym of American poet Edna St. Vincent Millay
Neal E. Boyd (1975–2018), American opera singer and 2008 America's Got Talent winner
Neva Boyd, American educator
Norma Elizabeth Boyd, American sorority organiser

O
Oil Can Boyd (born 1959), American baseball player

P
Pattie Boyd, British model and photographer
Penleigh Boyd, Australian artist
Peter Boyd, American bridge player
Peter Boyd (Trevor Eve), fictional character in the TV series Waking the Dead
Paul Boyd (disambiguation), several people

R
Rakeem Boyd (born 1998), American football player
Rhea Boyd, American paediatrician
Richard Boyd (1942–2021), American philosopher
Richard Henry Boyd (R.H. Boyd, 1843–1922), African American minister and religious publisher
Richard Boyd Barrett (born 1967), Irish politician
Robbie Boyd, British singer/songwriter
Robert Boyd (disambiguation), several people
Robert Boyd, 1st Lord Boyd (d. 1482)
Robert Boyd, 4th Lord Boyd (d. c.1557) (acceded Lordship 1547)
Robert Boyd, 5th Lord Boyd (c.1517–1559) (acceded Lordship 1558)
Robert Boyd, 7th Lord Boyd (1595–1628)
Robert Boyd, 8th Lord Boyd (c.1618–1640)
 Robin Boyd (architect) (1919–1971), Australian architect, writer, teacher and social commentator
 Robin Boyd (theologian) (1924–2018), Irish theologian and missionary to India
Russell Boyd (born 1944), Australian cinematographer

S
Sam Boyd, American gambling entrepreneur
Sarah Boyd-Carpenter (born 1946), now Sarah Hogg, Viscountess Hailsham, The Baroness Hogg, British economist, journalist, business executive and politician
Shannon Boyd (born 1992), Australian rugby league player
Simon Lennox-Boyd, 2nd Viscount Boyd of Merton (born 1939), British peer
Stephen Boyd, Irish actor
Stephen P. Boyd, American professor and control theorist
Stephen William Boyd, Irish professor

T
Terrence Boyd (born 1991), German-born American soccer player
Thomas Boyd (disambiguation), several people
Thomas Boyd, 1st Earl of Arran (died c. 1473), Scottish noble
Thomas Boyd, 6th Lord Boyd (c.1547–1611) (acceded Lordship 1560)
Travis Boyd (born 1993), American ice hockey player
Tyler Boyd (American football), American football player

V
Valerie Boyd (1963–2022), American writer and academic

W
Walter Boyd (disambiguation), several people
Wes Boyd, American software businessman and activist
Willard L. Boyd (1927-2022), American lawyer, president of the University of Iowa and of the Field Museum of Natural History
William Boyd (disambiguation), several people
Woody Boyd, fictional character from Cheers

Z
Zachary Boyd, Scottish theologian

References

Scottish surnames
Scottish Gaelic-language surnames
Toponymic surnames